Real Rob (stylized onscreen as REⱯL ROB) is an American streaming television sitcom created by Rob Schneider. It premiered on December 1, 2015, on Netflix, and follows the everyday life of Schneider, including his real-life wife Patricia and daughter Miranda. On July 27, 2016, the series was renewed for a second season, which premiered on September 29, 2017.

Cast

Main
 Rob Schneider as himself
 Patricia Schneider as herself, Rob's wife who is of Mexican descent and younger than he is.
 Jamie Lissow as himself, Rob's incompetent assistant.
 Miranda Scarlett Schneider as herself, introduced in the series as the 11-month-old daughter of Rob and Patricia.

Co-Starring
 Max Amini as Stalker, a guy who watches Rob's every move.
 Andrei Aldochine as Udo, a male stripper whom Patricia hires as their nanny.
 Adam Korson as Andy, Rob's agent.

Also Starring
 Kym Jackson as Margaret, Jamie's girlfriend who works at a marijuana store.
 Keith Stubbs as Rob's Accountant.

The series guest stars David Spade, Norm Macdonald, Adam Sandler, Michael Madsen, Danny Trejo, and George Lopez.

Episodes
Episodes were directed by Rob Schneider and written by Rob Schneider, Patricia Schneider and Jamie Lissow.

Season 1 (2015)

Season 2 (2017)

Reception
"Real Rob" was met with a largely negative response from critics. The show held a score of 36 on Metacritic based on 5 critic reviews, and a 0% rating on Rotten Tomatoes based on 8 critic reviews.

On February 20, 2016, Internet personality Arin Hanson voiced his frustrations regarding Real Rob on his daily Let's Play webseries Game Grumps. Hanson felt the show's main issue was that Schneider's character was both unlikable and unrelatable, going as far as to say that "it's a show with no demographic." While Hanson's overall feelings toward the show were negative, he stated that he felt compelled to keep watching and also praised the performance of Patricia Schneider, citing her as a legitimately funny presence. Schneider eventually saw Hanson's rant and later appeared as a special guest on the show along with Patricia on May 16, 2016.

References

External links
Real Rob on Netflix
 

2015 American television series debuts
2017 American television series endings
2010s American single-camera sitcoms
Television shows filmed in Los Angeles
English-language Netflix original programming